Chloe Wilcox (born 20 December 1986, Carlisle) is a British water polo player. She competed for Great Britain in the women's tournament at the 2012 Summer Olympics. This was the first ever Olympic GB women's water polo team. She also represented Great Britain at the 2013 World Championships. She has played for the Spanish club CN Mataró in the División de Honor de Waterpolo and the Balmian Tigers, Sydney Australia. She is currently working at Manchester Met University in the High Performance Sports Team.

References

1986 births
Living people
English female water polo players
Olympic water polo players of Great Britain
Water polo players at the 2012 Summer Olympics
Sportspeople  from Carlisle, Cumbria